The 2017–18 ProA was the 11th season of the ProA, the second level of basketball in Germany. The champions and the runners-up of the play-offs are promoted to the 2018–19 Basketball Bundesliga.

Regular season

Table

Play-offs
The quarter-finals and semi-finals were played in a best-of-five play-off format. The Finals are played in a two-legged series in which the team with the most aggregate points wins.

Bracket

Quarterfinals

Semifinals

Finals

First leg

Second leg

Final standings

See also
2017–18 Basketball Bundesliga

References

External links
 Official website
 Eurobasket.com

ProA seasons
Germany
2017–18 in German basketball leagues